Natalie Grandin and Vladimíra Uhlířová were the defending champions, but lost in the semifinals to Janette Husárová and Katalin Marosi.

Janette Husárová and Katalin Marosi won the title, defeating Eva Birnerová and Anne Keothavong in the final, 6–1, 3–6, [10–6].

Seeds

Draw

Draw

References
 Main Draw

The Bahamas Women's Open - Doubles